Walter Boudreau,  (born 1947 in Sorel) is a Canadian composer, saxophonist and conductor.  In 1969, he founded the group L'Infonie with Raoul Duguay, which dissolved in 1973. Since 1988, he has been the artistic director of the Société de musique contemporaine du Québec in Montreal. He was a principal collaborator in the  Symphonie du Millénaire which took place in Montréal in 2000. In May 2015 Boudreau received a Governor General's Performing Arts Award, Canada's highest honour in the performing arts.

Teachers
 Serge Garant
 Mauricio Kagel
 György Ligeti
 Bruce Mather
 Karlheinz Stockhausen
 Gilles Tremblay
 Iannis Xenakis

Films
 La Nuit de la poésie 27 mars 1970, 1971
 L'Infonie inachevée, 1972
 Fanfares, 1988

Awards
 1982 - Prix Jules-Léger
 1998 - Prix Opus : compositeur de l'année
 2003 - Molson Prize
 2004 - Prix Denise-Pelletier
 2013 - Knight of the National Order of Quebec
 2013 - Member of the Order of Canada
 2015 - Governor General's Performing Arts Award
 Grants from the  Canadian Arts Council
 National Young Composers Competition (Radio-Canada)

See also

 Music of Canada
 List of Canadian composers

References

21st-century classical composers
Canadian classical composers
Male conductors (music)
Jules Léger Prize for New Chamber Music winners
Prix Denise-Pelletier winners
1947 births
Living people
People from Sorel-Tracy
Canadian saxophonists
Male saxophonists
Knights of the National Order of Quebec
Members of the Order of Canada
Canadian male classical composers
Governor General's Performing Arts Award winners
21st-century saxophonists
21st-century Canadian conductors (music)
21st-century Canadian male musicians